Palakkalthazhe Mathai Mathew (January 1933 – 28 September 2020) popularly known as Dr. P. M. Mathew Vellore, was an Indian psychologist, columnist, writer and actor from Kerala, credited with popularizing the subjects of Psychology and Sexology in Kerala. He was known for his clinical service as well as for the several psychology-related articles and columns he wrote in Malayalam periodicals during the last quarter of 20th century. He was also the author of over 20 books and acted in three Malayalam films.

Biography 
P. M. Mathew was born in January 1933 at Karipuzha, a small hamlet near Mavelikkara in Alappuzha district of the south Indian state of Kerala. After completing a post-graduate degree in Psychology from the University of Kerala, he secured a doctorate from the same university as well as a diploma in clinical psychology before joining Christian Medical College Vellore where he served as a clinical psychologist and a member of the faculty until 1970. On his return to Kerala, he started a psychiatry clinic in Thiruvananthapuram where he continued clinical practice until his retirement. He also headed the departments of Psychology, Philosophy and Education of the Government of Kerala.

Mathew, who is credited with popularizing Psychology and Sexology in Kerala, wrote over 20 books on psychology which included Dambathya Prashnangal and Manasika Prashnangal and was a prolific columnist during 1970s and 1980s. Rathi Vijnana Kosam, an encyclopedia on sexology, is considered by many as a reference book on the subject in Malayalam language.

He edited two periodicals, Manashasthram and Kudumbajeevitham and was a founding member of Narma Kairali, a humorists' group, based in Thiruvananthapuram. He also acted in three films, Rathri Mazha of Lenin Rajendran, Nizhalkuthu of Adoor Gopalakrishnan and Ee Kanni Koodi of K. G. George.

Mathew was married to Susy and the couple had three children, Sajjan, Reba and Lola. He was bed-ridden for the last 5 years of his life and died on 28 September 2020, at the age of 87, at his Plamoodu residence in Thiruvananthapuram, due to age-related illnesses.

Selected bibliography

Filmography

References

Further reading

External links 
 
 
 
 

People from Kerala
People from Alappuzha district
Indian psychologists
Indian male writers
Malayalam-language writers
Writers from Alappuzha
2020 deaths
Indian medical academics
Indian medical writers
Indian male film actors
1933 births
Indian sexologists